Veryovkina Cave (also spelled Verëvkina Cave) is a cave in Abkhazia, a breakaway region of Georgia. At 2,212 meters (7,257 ft) deep, it is the deepest-known cave on Earth. Veryovkina is in the Arabika Massif, in the Gagra Mountain Range of the Western Caucasus, on the pass between the Krepost and Zont mountains, close to the slopes of Mount Krepost. Its entrance is 2,285 metres (7,497 ft) above sea level. The entrance of the cave has a cross section of 3 m × 4 m (9.8 ft × 13.1 ft), and the depth of the entrance shaft is 32 metres (105 ft).

Naming 
In 1968, the cave was assigned the name S-115, which was later replaced by P1-7, and in 1986 it was renamed after caver and cave diver Alexander Verëvkin. Verëvkin died in 1983 while exploring a siphon in the cave Su-Akan, located in the Sary-Tala massif, now Kabardino-Balkaria, Russia.

Discovery 

 The entrance is located in the Gagra District of Abkhazia, Georgia.
 1968: the cave was discovered by cavers from Krasnoyarsk.
 1982: the cave was discovered for the second time by the expedition of the "Perovo" speleoclub from Moscow. It was marked as P1-7. 
 1986–2000: work in the cave did not take place.

Explorations after 2000 

 From 2000 to 2015 – the speleoclub "Perovo" and its team "Perovo-speleo" researched the cave bottom.
 August 2015 – cavers from the speleoclub "Perovo" discovered a new shaft, but could not explore it because they did not have rope. This discovery opened the way to a series of later discoveries.
 June 2016 – the expedition of the team "Perovo-speleo" took place. The team started from the same point. They surveyed a pit that was about 30 m deep and a small system of passages below. The next day Evgenyj Kuzmin climbed over the wall of boulders and found the head of the Babatunda pit. Its depth was later determined to be .
The cave advanced to the second deepest in the world, after Krubera (Voronya) cave.
An ancient collector of the karst aquifer system with extensive horizontal tunnels, not typical for the Arabika Massif, was discovered. Veryovkina became the second super deep cave (over ) and the deepest accessible without diving equipment.
 March 2018 – another expedition of the same team added more than a kilometer of tunnels to the cave map. They also measured the depth of The Last Nemo Station terminal siphon lake.
 September 2018 – a photo trip of the "Perovo-speleo" team to the bottom of the cave took place, led by Pavel Demidov, with the English cave photographer Robbie Shone. The team narrowly escaped the flood caused by a rain storm, which filled the lower level of the cave.
 August 2019 – the final cave length, was surveyed by members of the speleoclub "Perovo".
He was later identified as Sergei Kozeev, who left his home in Sochi (Russia) on 1 November 2020 and began descent into Veryovkina, where he spent around a week at a  permanent camp. Then he continued his descent down to technically challenging parts at  where he got stuck due to inadequate equipment and skill, and died of hypothermia. The body was eventually recovered after a complex retrieval operation on 17 August 2021.

See also 
 List of caves
 List of deepest caves
 Speleology

Notes

References 

 CAVES information system (Russian)

Caves of Abkhazia
Caves of Georgia (country)
Limestone caves
Wild caves
Gagra District